EcoCheyenne is a grassroots environmental activism group composed of Northern Cheyenne tribal members founded in 2013. Their goals include working alongside other activist groups, tribal councils, and the ranching community to advocate for sustainability and preservation of the Northern Cheyenne reservation and the surrounding Powder River Basin amidst the high demand for extraction of its fossil fuel resources.

History

Founding 
EcoCheyenne was founded by Vanessa Braided Hair and her father, Otto Braided Hair Jr., in response to Arch Coal applying for permits to begin surface mining operations in Otter Creek and to begin development of the Tongue River Railroad to allow for coal exports to Asia via Pacific Northwest ports.

Coal 
Through the use of social media as well as traveling door to door in the Northern Cheyenne reservation, EcoCheyenne advocated against coal mining by sharing event invitations and news articles that drew attention to the potential implications of coal for the globe and for the local communities and environment In 2013 EcoCheyenne held "We Draw the Line" events and rallies with the Lummi Nation involving a touring totem pole to specifically promote awareness of the Tongue River Railroad and Otter Creek mine proposals. "Beyond Coal" rallies were held by EcoCheyenne throughout 2015 preceding public hearings about the Tongue River Railroad in towns including Lame Deer and Ashland, Montana. EcoCheyenne also encouraged public involvement by Northern Cheyenne members to oppose the Otter Creek mining permits.

EcoCheyenne's campaign against the Otter Creek mine and affiliated coal infrastructure proposals concluded in 2016 when Arch Coal filed for bankruptcy and had their permit applications for Otter Creek removed.

Solar 
During their campaign against Arch Coal, EcoCheyenne also used their social media to promote renewable energy sources like solar to the local communities. Their push for solar energy continued after the end of their campaign against the Otter Creek mine. Otto and Vanessa Braided Hair, along with Chéri Smith and Solar City, worked to provide solar energy to tribal members with philanthropic and federal funding.

Chéri Smith, Otto, and Vanessa Braided Hair continued working together as leaders of the Indigenized Energy Initiative to provide not only the funding and resources for tribal solar installations, but also to provide tribes with the help they need to become independent from the energy grid.

Oil 
EcoCheyenne continued to push back against fossil fuels during 2016 and into 2017 they switched their focus to advocating against the Dakota Access Pipeline on their social media. Vanessa Braided Hair held a prayer gathering with the Standing Rock Sioux tribe in Lame Deer, Montana. The focus of the prayers at this event were for protection of the people of the tribe, the pipeline protestors, as well as the water affected by the pipeline. Another event EcoCheyenne promoted was the "No Dakota Access Pipeline Sanding Rock Benefit Concert". 

Vanessa and Otto Braided hair continued to protest the Dakota Access Pipeline alongside the Indigenized Energy Initiative.

References 

Wikipedia Student Program
Environmental organizations based in the United States
Native American organizations